There She Goes is a British comedy-drama television series created and written by Shaun Pye, and based on his own experiences with his daughter who was born with a chromosomal disorder. The show follows the life of learning-disabled Rosie Yates, along with her parents Emily and Simon, and her older brother Ben. Both series are set in Rosie's present, but the writing features frequent analepses back to her infancy and pre-school life (around ten years previously), when her parents were gradually learning of Rosie's disability.

It was originally produced by Merman Television Ltd for BBC Four, but later moved to sister channel BBC Two for the second series. The programme received mostly positive reviews.

In January 2023, filming began for a one-off hour-long special.

Cast and characters
 Miley Locke as Rosie Yates, a non-verbal child with a learning disability (a rare chromosomal condition)
 David Tennant as Simon Yates, Rosie's father. Simon uses humour and sarcasm to deflect from his anxieties about parenthood, and (in flashbacks) from his alcoholism when Rosie was a toddler.
 Jessica Hynes as Emily Yates, Rosie's mother. She is more practical and accepting of her daughter's disability than Simon is. She gives birth to Rosie in 2006.
 Edan Hayhurst as Ben Yates, Rosie's well-behaved older brother
 Yasmine Akram as Helen, a friend of Simon's, in whom he confides during their trips to the pub
 Ben Willbond as Chris, the Yates's next door neighbour
 Maya Kelly as Ellie, Chris's daughter
 Nigel Planer as Grandad "Gandalf" Pat, Emily's father
 Philip Jackson as Grandad John, Simon's stepdad
 Serena Evans as Grandma Cath, Emily's mother
 Jo Cameron Brown as Nana Anne, Simon's mother
 Justin Edwards as Barney, Simon's friend
 Amber Aga as Katrina, Emily's co-worker
 Joseph Harmon as Jamie, Ben's friend from school
 Michael Gould as Dr Pritchard
 Gregor Fisher as Bill Yates, Simon's father, who left the family when Simon was a boy

Episodes

Series 1 (2018)

Series 2 (2020)

Production
Written by the married couple Shaun Pye and Sarah Crawford, the programme is based on real-life events with their learning disabled daughter Joey ("Jo"), who was born in 2006. Pye would regularly make Facebook posts about funny incidents involving Jo, to positive feedback from friends, leading him to consider that the topic could be suitable for a sitcom. However, he noted that it is not "a generalised story about disability", only one about his experiences. Whilst not wanting to "sugarcoat" his experiences, he did want to demonstrate how "wonderful" his life with his daughter is.

Pye's first draft focused on a more sympathetically-portrayed Simon, but this was rewritten after he showed his wife Sarah the script. Sarah had a considerable role in the writing of the show, with her and Pye having lengthy conversations about the darker period of their life, which the 2006 timeline is based on. Pye commented that Simon's dialogue is based on his own manner of speech, rather than what may be considered politically correct. The programme's title comes from the song "There She Goes" by The La's, which Pye listened to while writing the first script.

Jessica Hynes and David Tennant were cast as parents Emily and Simon Yates, having worked together on the science fiction programme Doctor Who in the past. They found that their familiarity with each other aided their acting as a couple. Hynes was interested in the script because of its "naturalistic" presentation of family life and the "familiar and recognisable" mother character. As a parent, Hynes found much of the material relatable and could "completely identify with" Sarah. She aimed to create something "unerringly truthful" and described the series as "gentle, poignant, truthful and funny".

Tennant knew Pye prior to the series, having also worked with him when appearing on the panel show Have I Got News For You and talk show The Jonathan Ross Show. Tennant said that he was attracted to the role as the writing was "so honest and so candid". He said that his acting style was "ruthlessly honest", commenting that "at no point are we trying to construct comic moments" as the power of the story is that "it is just what happened". At the time of filming, Tennant had three children and said that the series affected his perspective on parenthood.

Miley Locke, who does not have learning difficulties, was cast as Rosie. Though disabled actors were auditioned for the role, advice from psychologists was that the long working hours with minimal breaks would be too burdensome for a learning disabled child. Characters such as the Yates' neighbour are based on real people from Pye's life, as are some scenes such as Simon taking Rosie to a Baby Sing class and Emily hearing Rosie laugh for the first time. During filming, Pye had to leave the set for a couple of scenes due to the emotive acting by Hynes and Tennant.

Filming for a one-hour special after the second series began on 16 January 2023. It is set to focus on Rosie's changing behaviour as she undergoes puberty. Crawford said that it was based on their family's experiences in early 2020, when they underwent "the most poignantly funny moments, painfully difficult lows and exhilaratingly uplifting highs of life with Joey".

Analysis
Pye has a background in comedy writing, but he describes the show as comedy-drama. It also contains some traits of biopics and tragicomedies. Its humour is dark, bleak and contains bathos; it is presented in the form of one-liners. Rachel Aroesti of The Guardian commented that the show is rare in that it shows the negative effects of motherhood, and compared it to the 2018 thriller series The Cry.

Reception

Critical response

On the review aggregator website Rotten Tomatoes, for the first season, 82% of 11 critics' reviews are positive, with an average rating of 8 out of 10. The website's consensus reads, "There She Goes is a gently mirthful and moving exploration of a family unit doing their best to cope with disability, offering a mature view on the issue along with lovely performances." For the second season, 100% of six critics' reviews are positive, with an average rating of 8.2 out of 10.

Victoria Segal of The Sunday Times chose There She Goes as the "TV pick of the week". Segal commented that the "gallows humour might be a bit tough for some viewers to stomach", but praises that the parents are presented as loving whilst still sometimes acting poorly. 
The Times Chris Bennion rated the programme four out of five stars, calling it "bracingly honest" and "a marvel from start to finish". Sean O'Grady of The Independent also gave the show four out of five stars, praising the "searing emotional honesty" and the "sensitive and engaging" acting of Hynes and Tennant. O'Grady gives the first series finale a rating of four out of five stars, lauding the "formidable quantity of quality talent".

Louisa Mellor of Den of Geek praised There She Goes as "unsentimental, honest [and] well-written", lauding the usage of two timelines, so the "lighter and warmer" 2015 timeline can balance the 2006 timeline which is "full of pain". Mellor praised Pye for being "bravely unflattering" in his portrayal of Simon, and for his "boldly unsentimental writing and diamond-clear truths". Aroesti gave the show a positive review, describing it as an "uplifting experience". She praised the programme as "mordantly, outrageously funny" and lauded Hynes' acting. Joel Keller of Decider praised Pye for demonstrating that Simon "can be a total prat" at times, calling the programme a "very realistic and balanced look" at parenthood which any parent can relate to. Keller praised Locke, saying he was surprised to find out that she was not disabled, but found Tennant's Scottish accent tough to understand. Euan Ferguson of The Observer described Pye's writing as "gutsily and refreshingly honest" and praises its delivery by Hynes and Tennant.

In a negative review for New Statesman, Rachel Cooke described the show as "airless and over-loaded", criticising the number of flashbacks. Cooke praised it as "determinedly unsentimental" but described the humour as "a few carefully deployed bad-taste gags". Whilst Saskia Baron of The Arts Desk approved that the parents were not "impossibly warm and saintly", she found that some of their dialogue made for "uncomfortable viewing" and recommended "more consideration of the feelings of learning disabled people and perhaps their greater involvement". However, Baron praised the programme's "ring of complete authenticity" and hoped that it would "[make] viewers think before rushing to judgement next time they see someone with unusual behaviour".

Accolades

Release
A short trailer for the programme was released on the BBC website on 5 October 2018. The first series premiered on BBC Four in the UK, from 16 October to 13 November 2018. It is available in the United States and Canada on the streaming service Britbox.

References

Notes

External links
 
 Official website
 

2018 British television series debuts
2020 British television series endings
2010s British comedy-drama television series
2020s British comedy-drama television series
BBC Television shows
English-language television shows
Television shows about disability
Television series about families